Kohan is a Jewish surname. Notable people with the surname include:
 Buz Kohan (Alan Kohan, born 1933), American writer, producer, father of
 David Kohan (born 1964), American television producer
 Jenji Kohan (born 1969), American television writer, producer and director
 Martín Kohan (born 1967), Argentine author and essayist
 Amin Jahan Kohan, Iranian footballer
 Mohammad Mayeli Kohan (born 1953), Iranian football player

See also
 Janet Kohan-Sedq (1945 - 1972), Iranian athlete